Geeta Basra Singh (born 13 March 1984) is a British actress who has appeared in Bollywood films. She is married to Indian cricketer Harbhajan Singh. Cricketer Harbhajan Singh and model/actor Geeta Basra got married at a ceremony in a gurudwara near Jalandhar. Bollywood actress, Geeta Basra revealed how she was written off as a married woman, even when she and Harbhajan Singh were just friends.

Early life 
Basra was born to Indian Punjabi Hindu parents in Portsmouth, Hampshire on the south coast of England, but now resides in Mumbai, India. She has one younger brother, Rahul and sister Ruby.

She studied acting at the Kishore Namit Kapoor Acting Institute.

Career 
She was first seen in the Emraan Hashmi-starrer Dil Diya Hai in 2006 in which she played a girl who is sold into prostitution by her lover. Her second release, The Train (2007), was also opposite Hashmi. She played Roma, a working woman who gets caught up in an extramarital affair.

Basra was also seen in the music video for the Sukshinder Shinda and Rahat Fateh Ali Khan song "Ghum Sum Ghum Sum", playing the love interest of the male protagonist played by Rahul Bhat.

Personal life 

Basra married Indian cricketer Harbhajan Singh on 29 October 2015 in Jalandhar, Punjab. They have a daughter, Hinaya Heer Plaha, born on 27 July 2016 in Portsmouth, Hampshire. and a son, Jovan Veer Singh Plaha, born on 10 July 2021.

Filmography

References

External links 

 
 
 
 

1984 births
Living people
Actresses from Portsmouth
Punjabi people
British film actresses
Actresses in Hindi cinema
Actresses in Punjabi cinema
British people of Punjabi descent
British actresses of Indian descent
British emigrants to India
British expatriate actresses in India
European actresses in India
21st-century British actresses